Scrubbers is a 1982 British drama film directed by Mai Zetterling and produced by Don Boyd starring Amanda York, Kathy Burke, and Chrissie Cotterill. It was shot primarily in Virginia Water, Surrey, England. It was inspired by the success of the 1979 film Scum.

A novel based on the film, and also entitled Scrubbers, was written by Alexis Lykiard and published in London by W. H. Allen Ltd in 1982.

Plot
Two girls escape from an open borstal. Annetta (Chrissie Cotterill) wants to visit her baby daughter who is being raised in a convent. Carol (Amanda York) plans to be recaptured and sent to the closed borstal where her girlfriend Doreen is being held. Carol's plan works, but she is devastated to find that Doreen has a new girlfriend. Doreen and the girlfriend taunt Carol. Annetta is arrested at the convent and sent to the same closed borstal. She assumes Carol "grassed" her up and proceeds to plan her revenge. Inmate Eddie professes her love for Carol and offers protection, so Carol begins a relationship with her. Annetta's constant bullying attempts keep her in solitary confinement. When Eddie is released Carol loses her protection and Annetta plans another attack.

Cast

References

External links
 
 
 

1982 films
Films directed by Mai Zetterling
Women in prison films
1982 drama films
British drama films
1980s English-language films
1980s British films